The eleven-member Sovereignty Council of Sudan was the collective head of state of Sudan from 20 August 2019, when it was created by the August 2019 Draft Constitutional Declaration, until 25 October 2021, when it was dissolved following the October 2021 Sudanese coup d'état. The Council was to have been the head of state for a 39-month transitional period, scheduled to end in November 2022.

Under Article 10.(b) of the Draft Constitutional Declaration, it was composed of five civilians chosen by the Forces of Freedom and Change alliance (FFC), five military representatives chosen by the Transitional Military Council (TMC), and a civilian selected by agreement between the FFC and TMC. The chair for the first 21 months was a military member, Abdel Fattah al-Burhan, and for the remaining 18 months the chair was to be a civilian member, under Article 10.(c). The Sovereignty Council was mostly male, with only two female members: Aisha Musa el-Said and Raja Nicola. Under Article 19 of the Draft Constitutional Declaration, the eleven Sovereignty Council members are ineligible to run in the election scheduled to follow the transition period.

Background
Sudan had multi-member Sovereignty Councils holding the role of head of state of Sudan several times during the twentieth century. Following more than half a year of sustained civil disobedience and a shift of the presidency from Omar al-Bashir to the Transitional Military Council (TMC) in April 2019 by a coup d'etat, the TMC and the Forces of Freedom and Change alliance (FFC) made a July 2019 Political Agreement and completed it by the August 2019 Draft Constitutional Declaration. Articles 9.(a) and 10.(a) of the August 2019 Draft Constitutional Declaration both transfer the role of head of state to the Sovereignty Council.

Structure and membership
Article 10.(b) of the Draft Constitutional Declaration defines the Sovereignty Council to consist of five civilians chosen by the FFC, five military chosen by the TMC, and a civilian "selected by agreement" between the FFC and TMC.

Under Article 10.(c) of the Draft Constitutional Declaration, for the first 21 months of the 39-month transitional period defined by the document, the chair of the Sovereignty Council was to be chosen by the five military members of the council. For the following 18 months, the chair was to be chosen by the five civilian members selected by the FFC.

The military membership of the Sovereignty Council included General Abdel Fattah al-Burhan, General Mohamed Hamdan Dagalo ("Hemetti"), Lieutenant-General Yasser al-Atta, General Shams al-Din Khabbashi and Major-General Ibrahim Jabir Karim. Mohamed Hamdan Dagalo is the deputy chairman of the Sovereignty Council.

The five civilians chosen by the FFC are Aisha Musa el-Said of the National Gathering Initiative; Siddiq Tawer, a prominent member of the Arab Socialist Ba'ath Party – Region of Sudan (and thereby a member of the National Consensus Forces) from the Nuba Mountains in South Kordofan; Mohamed al-Faki Suleiman of the Unionist Association from Northern Sudan; Hassan Sheikh Idris (or Hassan Mohamed Idris), a prominent member of the National Umma Party (and thereby a member of Sudan Call) from Kassala; and Mohammed Hassan Osman al-Ta'ishi of the Sudanese Professionals Association. Taha Othman Ishaq (or Osman), a lawyer and member of the FFC negotiating committee, declined his nomination by the FFC to the Sovereignty Council on the grounds that the FFC alliance had earlier agreed that members of the negotiating committee should not become members of the Sovereignty Council.

Raja Nicola was the civilian member of the Sovereignty Council mutually chosen by the FFC and TMC. The choice of Nicola, as a member of the Sudanese Copt community, is seen as a symbol of respect for diversity, in particular to Sudanese Christians.

On 5 February 2021, al-Burhan issued a decree to add three new members to the Council. The new members are Sudanese Revolutionary Front leader El Hadi Idris Yahya, Sudan People's Liberation Movement-North leader Malik Agar, and Sudan Liberation Movement for Justice-Karbino leader El Tahrir Abubakr Hajar.

List of members 
The council had fourteen members as follows:

Abdel Fattah al-Burhan (chair)
Mohamed Hamdan Dagalo (vice-chair)
Yasser al-Atta
Shams al-Din Khabbashi
Ibrahim Jabir Karim
Aisha Musa el-Said
Siddiq Tawer
Mohamed al-Faki
Hassan Sheikh Idris
Mohammed Hassan al-Ta'ishi
Raja Nicola
El Hadi Idris Yahya
Malik Agar
El Tahrir Abubakr Hajar

Women's participation
The Sovereignty Council was mostly male, with two of the eleven members being female: Aisha Musa el-Said and Raja Nicola. At a lower level, Siham Osman was nominated Under-Secretary of the Minister of Justice, and acts on behalf of the Minister of Justice with his authorisation when he is on travels. 

The Sudanese Women's Union argued that women had played as significant a role as men in the political changes of 2019 and that Sudanese women "claim an equal share of 50-50 with men at all levels, measured by qualifications and capabilities".

Ineligibility in 2022
Under Article 19 of the August 2019 Draft Constitutional Declaration, the eleven members of the Sovereignty Council of the transitional period are forbidden (along with ministers and other senior transition leaders) from running in the 2022 Sudanese general election scheduled to end the transitional period.

Powers
Article 11.(a) lists 17 political powers held by the Sovereignty Council, including the appointment of the Prime Minister, confirmation of leaders of certain state bodies, the right to declare war or a state of emergency, and signing and ratifying national and international agreements.

Separation of powers
On 24 October, the Sudanese Professionals Association (SPA) claimed that civilian members of the Sovereignty Council violated the constitutional constraints on their power by appearing to coordinate with Rapid Support Forces (RSF) and override the Ministry of Health's role in managing vector control against the spread of dengue fever and chikungunya. The SPA stated, "the campaign appeared to be the scene of direct interaction of the [RSF] with the health situation in the concerned states, in the absence of health departments at the federal or state level. ... [The] whole issue of health is not the prerogative of the Sovereign Council." Sudan Tribune expressed concern that the RSF and its leader Hemetti were trying to improve the RSF's image, damaged by its carrying out of crimes against humanity in the War in Darfur and human rights violations during the 3 June 2019 Khartoum massacre.

Decision-making
Under Article 11.(c) of the Draft Constitutional Declaration, the Sovereignty Council makes decisions either by consensus, or when consensus is not possible, by a two-thirds majority (eight members).

Actions of the Sovereignty Council
The Sovereignty Council announced a state of emergency in Port Sudan during tribal clashes which resulted in the death of 16 people on 26 August 2019.

In November 2019, Abdalla Hamdok's government repealed all laws restricting women's freedom of dress, movement, association, work and study. On 22 April 2020, the transitional government issued an amendment to its criminal legislation which declares that anyone who performs Female Genital Mutilation either in a medical establishment or elsewhere will be punished by three years' imprisonment and a fine.

Dissolution
On 25 October 2021, in the 2021 Sudan coup d'état, Sovereignty Council leader Abdel Fattah al-Burhan dissolved the Council and declared that a new technocratic government would be nominated.

See also

List of heads of state of Sudan

References

External links

2019 establishments in Sudan
Sudanese Revolution
Heads of state of Sudan
Collective heads of state
Provisional governments